Numerous horse-drawn tramroads were constructed in South Wales during the Industrial Revolution, chiefly between the years 1790 and 1830 and connected with the iron and coal-mining industries.

The earliest tramroads were "edge-railways", where the wagons were guided by having flanged wheels running on plain rails, but from around 1800 most tramroads in the area were being made according to the principles of Benjamin Outram, with unflanged wheels running on L-section tracks fixed to stone-block sleepers; and many earlier lines were also rebuilt to these specifications. Track gauges were not standardised, but most were between 3 ft. 4 in and 4 ft. 4 in.

Overall, the early railways in South Wales covered about 400 miles, but between the 1840s and the 1860s most of the main lines were replaced by standard-gauge steam railways.

The list of tramroads in South Wales can be split into a number of regions:

Monmouthshire and Brecon Canal network
The canals converging on Newport Docks originally comprised two independent canals: the Monmouthshire Canal between Newport and Pontymoile Basin (as well as the Crumlin Arm, and the Brecknock and Abergavenny Canal between Pontymoile and Brecon. Numerous tramroads, some built by the canal companies themselves, converged on these canals, as well as forming cross-country routes not directly linked to the canals:

Taff Vale
This area encompasses the tramroads associated with the  Glamorganshire and Aberdare Canals, which ultimately led to Cardiff Docks:

Vale of Neath
Served by the Neath and Tennant Canal, which led to Neath and Port Tennant for the Swansea docks:

Swansea Canal tramroads
This canal led up the Tawe valley north-east from Swansea:

West of Swansea
A number of largely unconnected tramroads, some linked to the Kidwelly and Llanelly Canal:

Outlying areas
A number of unconnected tramroads in other parts of South Wales:

References

Bibliography
Priestley's Navigable Rivers and Canals, Joseph Priestley 1831
Coflein: National Monuments Record of Wales database
old-maps.co.uk
Bertram Baxter: Stone Blocks and Iron Rails, David & Charles, 1966
James Gilbert: Railways of England and Wales, E Grattan, 1838
Charles Hadfield: The Canals of South Wales and the Border, University of Wales Press & Phoenix House, 1960

Horse-drawn railways

Tramroads in South Wales
South Wales